Barrowhouse is a townland in southeast County Laois in Ireland. Barrowhouse is located close to the County Kildare border and the town of Athy. The Barrowhouse area holds the unusual distinction of being the only part of Laois in the Athy Roman Catholic parish and the Dublin R.C. Diocese. Barrowhouse gets its name as the River Barrow flows at the areas eastern border with Kildare.

Buildings
Barrowhouse has a Roman Catholic church called St. Marys built in 1831 at the time of the lifting of the penal laws. There is a three teacher primary school which has been in existence since 1830. The school is officially known as Shanganamore National School, however locals refer to it as Barrowhouse N.S. Students and teachers were relocated to the current school in 1999 after 169 years in the old school. The old school is now used as a community hall. Barrowhouse Gaelic football field is located in Shanganabeg.

St. Marys Church Barrowhouse
How Barrowhouse on the west bank of the Gaelic Irish side of the River Barrow in medieval times came to be included in the Dublin diocese is a mystery. The Church of St Mary's, the only Chapel of Ease within the parish of St Michael's, Athy, is reputed to have been built in the 1820s on a site donated by a Miss Fennell who lived in a thatched cottage to the left of the church. She would later leave her entire 15-acre holding to the local church.

St Mary's, built in anticipation of the granting of Catholic emancipation, was the post penal law replacement for a church at Tankardstown which in pre-reformation days served as the local church for the people of Barrowhouse and Tankardstown.

In Tankardstown graveyard today there can still be found some remains of that ancient church.

Shanganamore National School 

The first teacher in Barrowhouse is believed to have been a Hugh O’Connell. The scholar and theologian Monsignor Patrick Boylan attended Barrowhouse School, as did another cleric, Rev JJ Malone who spent his life in Australia. Malone was a writer and a poet and one of his better known poems was The Old White Washed Schoolhouse of Shanganamore. It was included in his book of poems Wild Briar and Wattle Blossoms published in Melbourne in 1914 which carried a photograph of the old school.

The old whitewashed schoolhouse was closed by the Department of Education in 1975 and its teachers were transferred to the newly opened school at Ballyroe. The people of Barrowhouse rallied to save their school and kept the school open, by paying the teachers out of their own pockets. In the face of the community's commitment, the Department of Education decided in 1976 to reopen the Barrowhouse School and the teachers were formally transferred back to their original positions. 

In the 1990s, after many years of campaigning, a new school was built on a site adjoining the old school. The new school was opened in October 1998 with 44 pupils on the roll book and two teachers.

As of 2011, Shanganamore National School had an enrollment of 80 pupils.

History
Barrowhouse, as it is known today, was originally two regions, Fasaghreban and Feranclan-ui-donal. One of the most significant landmarks in the Barrowhouse area is Dunbrin Fort, which is reputed to have been a Danish Station, because of coins found there. On 16 May 1921, two of a group of eight IRA volunteers were shot dead during an ambush on the Black and Tans, who regularly passed through the area going to Ballylynan. Today, the area is marked with a memorial to the deceased, William Connors and James Lacey. Barrowhouse also includes the ruins of Kilmorony House. There was once a horse racing course in Kilmorony but this has been gone for over 100 years. There is also a ruin of a Roman Catholic church and graveyard in Tankardstown. Barrowhouse was one of the last remaining Irish speaking areas in the region with the language dying out 200 years ago.

Kilmoroney House
Travellers on the R417 Athy to Carlow road will be aware of the gaunt ruin of a house on an eminence above the river Barrow.

This house was once the home of the Weldon family. The Weldons came to Ireland around 1600 and acquired considerable estates in Counties Laois and Kildare. It is through John Weldon of St. John's Bower, Athy, County Kildare that the direct line of the Weldon family in Kildare can be traced. In 1613 he was MP for Athy and in 1624 High Sheriff of County Kildare.

Over the next three centuries, members of the Weldon family played an active and prominent role in the life of County Kildare. The family papers in the National Archives show the family's social contacts in the early years of the 20th century through correspondence with such prominent people as Winston Churchill and Dr. Douglas Hyde. The family was essentially a military one and many members served the British Empire in India, Africa and the Far East. Captain George Anthony Weldon of the Royal Dublin Fusiliers was killed at Glencoe in October 1899 during the Boer War. Another member of the family, Major Arthur Stewart Weldon, served in South Africa and the First World War and was killed in action in March 1917. His brother-in-law Colonel Croshaw died of wounds received in the Great War in September 1917. The old British Legion Hall in Naas (Now the Scout Den) was dedicated to their memory. The last of the male line of Weldons to live at Kilmorony was Sir Anthony Arthur Weldon who became the sixth Baronet of Kilmorony on the death of his father in 1900. Sir Anthony died in 1917 as a result of shell shock received while fighting in France.

The main entrance to Kilmorony estate was on the Athy-Carlow road but has been obscured by road widening. The entrance avenue to the house crossed over the Barrow Navigational Canal and the River Barrow. The Canal Bridge is of cut stone and the Barrow Bridge is of a steel construction. Part of this bridge has now collapsed into the river.

Referred to as "Sportland" on the 1783 Taylor map of Kildare, Kilmorony was a fine Georgian house built some time after 1752 (it does not appear on the Noble and Keenan Map of 1752). The main block was of two stories over a basement of five bays and a balustraded roof parapet and a lower two-story wing of four bays. The house was dismantled in the late 1930s. The coach house of Kilmorony has survived and is now a private dwelling.

Kilmorony House is located two miles south-east of Athy on the Carlow road

Ambush and War of Independence

The ambush at Barrowhouse on 16 May 1921 was authorised but the eight men who took part were poorly equipped in terms of arms and ammunition. The participants in what would result in the last of the pre-truce casualties involving members of the Carlow Brigade were Captain Joe Maher of Cullenagh, Lieutenant Joe Lacey of Barrowhouse, Paddy Dooley of Kilabbin, Maganey, Mick Maher of Barrowhouse, Jack O’Brien of Barrowhouse, Joe Ryan of Kilmoroney, James Lacey of Barrowhouse and William Connor of Barrowhouse. Jack O’Brien, the last surviving member of the unsuccessful ambush, was interviewed by Jack McKenna many years ago when O’Brien was living in Kilkenny following his retirement from the Gardaí and he confirmed the names of the eight men involved. They had been members of an eight-man ambush party which planned to attack at Barrowhouse a group of RIC men who were travelling on bicycles from Ballylinan Barracks to nearby Grangemellon Barracks. The IRA men were members of the B. Company 5th Battalion Carlow Brigade. James Lacey and William Connor both were killed and are buried together in the same grave behind Barrowhouse Roman Catholic Church.

Early in the afternoon of 16 May 1921, eight young men from the Barrowhouse area left their homes and walked to a pre-arranged meeting place in the graveyard adjoining Barrowhouse Church. Their intention was to ambush Black and Tans stationed in Ballylinan who regularly travelled on the road between Maganey and Ballylinan. The local men were all members of B Company Carlow Brigade, Irish Republican Army based in the Barrowhouse area.

On the previous night arms and ammunition had been brought from Castledermot and delivered to Joe Maher of Cullinagh, who was leader of the Barrowhouse men. The I.R.A. had an extensive network of informers in all the police barracks in the area and Ballylinan and Athy were no exception in this regard. A contingent of Black and Tans were expected to pass through Barrowhouse that afternoon on their way from the Ballylinan Police Barracks to Maganey.

Seven of the local men armed for the most part with shotguns lay in wait while one man acted as a lookout. As the Black and Tans approached on bicycles the doors of the nearby school opened and the local children tumbled out into the bright sunlight of that May afternoon. The Black and Tans dismounted from their bicycles and walked past the waiting I.R.A. men surrounded on both sides by the young boys and girls on their way home.

The I.R.A. men realising that their proposed ambush was not now possible because of the proximity of the school children immediately changed their positions. Moving across the fields they sought to cut off the Black and Tans further up the road but as they did they lost the element of surprise. Their cover was also lost and contact between the members of the unit could not be maintained in the ever-changing circumstances.

The attack when it started was disastrous for the Barrowhouse men. The shotguns were very inaccurate and it is suspected that their ammunition was damp and ineffective. The Black and Tans reacted quickly and replied with deadly accurate fire from their Enfield rifles. Two of the I.R.A. Volunteers, William O'Connor and Jim Lacey, both from Barrowhouse, were killed. Their companions were helpless in the face of the superior firepower of the Black and Tans and withdrew from the scene. The survivors of the unsuccessful ambush party were Joe Maher, Cullinagh, Mick Maher, Barrowhouse, Joe Lacey, Barrowhouse, Jack O'Brien, Barrowhouse, Joe Ryan, Kilmoroney and Paddy Dooley, Killabbin, Maganey.

The bodies of O'Connor and Lacy were brought to the R.I.C. Barracks in Ballylinan and were released on the following Tuesday when they were conveyed to St. Mary's Church, Barrowhouse. On Thursday morning at 11.00 o'clock Requiem Office for the dead was chanted and Solemn High Mass celebrated with Rev. J. Nolan C.C., Athy, as celebrant. After the Mass the two coffins were carried on the shoulders of local men to the nearby graveyard. As the two coffins were lowered into the double grave a lone trumpeter sounded the Last Post.

On the night of the ambush, the home of John Lynch, Barrowhouse, one-time captain of the local I.R.A. Coy, was burnt by the Black and Tans. Joe Maher of Cullinagh who had led the ambush at Barrowhouse later enlisted in the Irish Free State Army where he became a Military Policeman. He resigned in 1924 when a number of ex British soldiers were given appointments as N.C.O.s in the new Army. The last survivor of the Barrowhouse ambush was Jack O'Brien, born on the day of the Gordon Bennett Race in Athy and thereafter known locally as "Gordon Bennett". He joined the Garda Siochana and died two years ago in Kilkenny where he had lived for many years.

The spot where O'Connor and Lacy died is today marked by a simple memorial at the side of the roadway.

Sport
The local Gaelic Athletic Association club is Barrowhouse GAA. Soccer is also played in Barrowhouse by St. Marys. Barrowhouse also had an Athletics club but this disbanded in the late seventies/ early eighties. Cricket was played in the area in the 1800s.

See also
 List of towns and villages in Ireland

References

Towns and villages in County Laois